Rock rabbit can refer to:
 Hyraxes, mammals of the Order Hyracoidea
 Pikas, mammals of the Family Ochotonidae
 Viscachas, mammals in the Family Chinchilloidea

Animal common name disambiguation pages